
Year 157 BC was a year of the pre-Julian Roman calendar. At the time it was known as the Year of the Consulship of Caesar and Orestes (or, less frequently, year 597 Ab urbe condita) and the Seventh Year of Houyuan. The denomination 157 BC for this year has been used since the early medieval period, when the Anno Domini calendar era became the prevalent method in Europe for naming years.

Events 
 By place 

 Roman Republic 
 The Carthaginians, prevented by their treaty with Rome from engaging in armed resistance, but equally guaranteed against any loss of territory, appeal to Rome against the depredations of King Masinissa of Numidia. The Roman censor Marcus Porcius Cato heads a commission which arbitrates a truce between Carthage and her former ally, Masinissa.
 During his time in Carthage, Cato is so struck by the evidence of Carthaginian prosperity that he is convinced that the security of Rome now depends on the annihilation of Carthage. From this time on, Cato keeps repeating the cry "Ceterum censeo Carthaginem esse delendam" ("Moreover, I advise that Carthage must be destroyed") at the end of all his speeches, no matter what subject they concern.
 After Ariarathes V has been deposed from the Cappadocian throne by the Seleucid king Demetrius I Soter and has fled to Rome, the new king of Cappadocia, Orophernes, sends two ambassadors to Rome to join the Seleucid emissaries of Demetrius in opposing Ariarathes V's return to power. Despite their efforts, Ariarathes V is restored to his throne by the Romans. However, Rome allows Orophernes to reign jointly with him. The joint government, however, does not last long, as Ariarathes V becomes sole king of Cappadocia shortly afterwards.

 Seleucid Empire 
 Jonathan Maccabeus is recognised by the Seleucids as a minor king within their dominions.

Births 
 30 July – Wu of Han, who will be emperor of the Chinese Han dynasty from 141 BC (d. 87 BC)
 Gaius Marius, Roman general and politician who will be elected consul seven times; he will also introduce major reforms to the Roman army, authorising recruitment of landless citizens and reorganising the structure of the legions (d. 86 BC)
 Sanatruces (also known as Sinatruces or Sanatruk), King of Parthia who will rule the Parthian Empire from around 77 BC (approximate date) (d. c. 70 BC)

Deaths 
 July 6 – Wen of Han, Emperor of the Chinese Han dynasty since 180 BC (b. 200 BC)

References